Oumar Diakhité (born 9 December 1993) is a Senegalese professional footballer who plays as a centre-back for German club SV Sandhausen.

Career

College and amateur 
Diakhité emigrated to the United States from Senegal, where he attended an academy run by the former Senegal international Salif Diao, to advance his football career. He joined Montverde Academy, a preparatory school in Montverde, Florida, as a junior in 2011. In 2012, he spent a season with Orlando City U-23 of the USL Premier Development League. He played 15 regular-season games, and scored four goals in that time.

Professional 
Diakhité bypassed college, and trialed with Orlando City of USL Pro in the 2013 preseason. He started several matches, including the home leg of a home-and-away friendly series with the Tampa Bay Rowdies.

Diakhité was signed by Orlando City on 4 April 2013. He saw his first competitive action on 14 May 2013, when he started in Orlando City's third round match in the 2013 Lamar Hunt U.S. Open Cup against Ocala Stampede. He played his first league match on 9 June 2013, against Antigua Barracuda FC.

In July 2013, Diakhité went to Olhanense on trial from Orlando City. On 1 August, he was officially transferred to Olhanense for an undisclosed fee.

On 10 July 2019, Diakhité signed a two-year contract with Liga I side Sepsi OSK. On 10 January 2020, he was released by Sepsi OSK.

In January 2021, after trialling with Eintracht Braunschweig, Diakhité joined the 2. Bundesliga club on a contract until summer 2022.

References

External links

1993 births
Living people
People from Kédougou
Senegalese footballers
Association football central defenders
Montverde Academy alumni
Orlando City U-23 players
Orlando City SC (2010–2014) players
S.C. Olhanense players
G.D. Estoril Praia players
Kazma SC players
Sepsi OSK Sfântu Gheorghe players
C.D. Aves players
Eintracht Braunschweig players
SV Sandhausen players
USL League Two players
USL Championship players
Primeira Liga players
Liga Portugal 2 players
Kuwait Premier League players
Liga I players
2. Bundesliga players
Senegalese expatriate footballers
Senegalese expatriate sportspeople in the United States
Expatriate soccer players in the United States
Senegalese expatriate sportspeople in Portugal
Expatriate footballers in Portugal
Senegalese expatriate sportspeople in Kuwait
Expatriate footballers in Kuwait
Senegalese expatriate sportspeople in Romania
Expatriate footballers in Romania
Senegalese expatriate sportspeople in Germany
Expatriate footballers in Germany